Hadith Bayāḍ wa Riyāḍ ("The Story of Bayad and Riyad") is a 13th-century Arabic love story. The main characters of the tale: Bayad, a merchant's son and a foreigner from Damascus, Riyad, a well-educated slave girl in the court of an unnamed Hajib (vizier or minister) of 'Iraq (Mesopotamia), and a "Lady" (al-sayyida).

The Hadith Bayad wa Riyad manuscript is one of three surviving illustrated manuscripts from medieval al-Andalus (in modern Spain and Portugal). Many non-illustrated Andalusi books do survive, so illustrated manuscripts may have been rare.  The manuscript is in the Vatican Library, where it is catalogued as Codex Vat. Arabo 368.

Gallery

See also
Arabic epic literature
Arabic literature

Further reading
 Alois R. Nykl. Historia de los amores de Bayad wa Riyad: Una chantefable oriental en estilo persa (Vat. Ar. 368). New York: Hispanic Society of America, 1941.
 Arianna D'Ottone, Il manoscritto Vaticano arabo 368: Hadith Bayad wa Riyad. Il codice, il testo, le immagini: alcune note, «Rivista di Storia della Miniatura» 14 (2010): 55-70
 La storia di Bayad e Riyad (Vat.ar. 368). Una nuova edizione e traduzione, ed. and trans. Arianna D'Ottone. Città del Vaticano, Biblioteca Apostolica Vaticana, 2013 (Studi e Testi 479). .
The Story of Bayad and Riyad - Qissat Bayad wa Riyad .
Cynthia Robinson, Medieval Andalusian Courtly Culture in the Mediterranean: Hadith Bayad Wa Riyad. New York: Routledge, 2007. .

References

External links
Al-Andalus: the art of Islamic Spain, an exhibition catalog from The Metropolitan Museum of Art (fully available online as PDF), which contains material on Hadith Bayad wa Riyad (see index)

13th-century Arabic books
Islamic illuminated manuscripts
13th-century illuminated manuscripts
Manuscripts of the Vatican Library
Islamic art of Spain
Medieval Arabic literature
Love in Arabic literature